For the English former professional footballer, see Stacy Long.

Stacy Long (born September 30, 1967) is an American former football player who was a consensus All-American at offensive guard during his senior year of college football with the Clemson Tigers in 1990. Long was drafted in the 11th round of the 1991 NFL Draft by the Chicago Bears, but didn't play in the NFL.

References

1967 births
Living people
American football offensive linemen
Clemson Tigers football players
All-American college football players
People from Griffin, Georgia
Players of American football from Georgia (U.S. state)